"Sacramento (A Wonderful Town)" is a song by Scottish band Middle of the Road, released as a single in November 1971. It peaked at number 23 on the UK Singles Chart, showing the band's decline in popularity in the UK. However, elsewhere, the band continued their success in Europe, topping the charts in several countries.

Release
"Sacramento (A Wonderful Town)" was first released in November 1971 in Italy, before being released in the Netherlands and Germany the following month. It was released in the UK on 17 March 1972. In most countries, it was released with the B-side "Love Sweet Love", which was written by Italian brothers Giosy and Mario Capuano, as well as Middle of the Road guitarist Ian McCredie. However, in a few countries, Spain, Peru and New Zealand, "Sacramento" was released with the B-side "Samson and Delilah", which was later released as the follow-up single.

Track listings
7"
 "Sacramento (A Wonderful Town)" – 2:48
 "Love Sweet Love" – 3:34

7"
 "Sacramento (A Wonderful Town)" – 2:48
 "Samson and Delilah" – 3:02

Charts

Weekly charts

Year-end charts

References

1971 singles
Ultratop 50 Singles (Flanders) number-one singles
Ultratop 50 Singles (Wallonia) number-one singles
Number-one singles in Germany
Dutch Top 40 number-one singles
Number-one singles in Norway
Number-one singles in Switzerland
Middle of the Road songs
RCA Victor singles
1971 songs